was a renowned Japanese photographer.

He graduated from Hokkaido University in 1944.

References

1924 births
2016 deaths
Japanese photographers
Japanese mammalogists
People from Shizuoka (city)
Hokkaido University alumni